Bhangabazar is a village in the Karimganj district of the Indian State of Assam. It comes under the Badarpur block, and is administered by Masli gram panchayat. It has the busiest market in the Karimganj district.

Geography 
Bhangabazar is located at 24.89°N 92.55°E. It has an average elevation of 15 metres. It is situated on the south bank of Kushiyara River which separate the town from Bangladesh.

The distance of Bhangabazar town from the state capital of Assam, Guwahati is 310.8 km via NH 44, 13.8 km from Badarpur, Assam, 14.8 km from Karimganj, Assam. Bhanga Bazar was the original part of Sylhet District wherein a large number of people have been gathered in two days for a week for their business purposes such as betel nut, domestic items and cattle markets etc. But at present there is no such market as in previous time due to international border areas.

Schools and colleges 
[ affiliated to  Secondary Board of Education, Assam (SEBA) & the colleges are affiliated to Assam Higher Secondary Education Council.Most eminent schools are Talent Academy run by MAMM Foundation an Aziz Ahmed Choudhury initiative). Model High School, Gurucharan High School, Bhanga Higher Secondary School & Bhanga Public High School. Notable alumni of Model High School Includes Fayez Ahmed. An alternative medical institute called Regional Paramedical Institute.

References

Villages in Karimganj district